Terence Robert Cashion (7 April 1921 – 8 October 2011) was an award-winning Australian rules footballer from Tasmania who played numerous representative matches for the state and also played for South Melbourne in the Victorian Football League (VFL).

Early life and junior career
Terry was born to parents Albert and Mary Cashion (née Clements) in April 1921 when the family lived in Goulburn Street, North Hobart.

Cashion first began to come under notice as a player during his junior career with Buckingham.

Senior career in Tasmania
A rover, he had started his senior career with New Town in the TANFL in 1939 and played there until the end of the 1941 season. After time in the army during World War Two he returned to the league in 1947 where he played with Clarence. In the 1947 Hobart Carnival he made his debut for the Tasmanian interstate team and won the Stancombe Trophy. He won the trophy again at the 1950 Brisbane Carnival and also became the only Tasmanian player to have won a Tassie Medal.

He had a stint at Longford from 1948 to 1951 where he won the NTFA best and fairest Tasman Shields Trophy three times. In 1948 Cashion tied with Harry Styles for the award. He won it outright in 1950, and again tied for the award in 1951, this time with Darrel Crosswell.

Cashion then returned to the TFL with Sandy Bay where he won a William Leitch Medal in 1953, before retiring at the end of the season having played 193 club and representative games. Cashion won a total of seven best and fairest awards at his various Tasmanian clubs.

On the mainland
Cashion played five Victorian Football League (VFL) games for South Melbourne in 1942 while stationed in Victoria with the army and would have played more had it not been for a knee injury.

Personal life
Terry Cashion served as a private in the Australian Army during World War Two. In day-to-day life after returning to Tasmania he had a career as a carpenter involved in the house building trade.

In June 2004 he was selected as a rover in Tasmania's official 'Team of the Century' and in 2009 was inducted as an icon in the Tasmanian Football Hall of Fame.

In 2022 he was inducted into the Australian Football Hall of Fame.

References

External links

1921 births
2011 deaths
Sydney Swans players
Australian rules footballers from Tasmania
William Leitch Medal winners
Clarence Football Club players
Glenorchy Football Club players
Longford Football Club players
Sandy Bay Football Club players
Tasmanian Football Hall of Fame inductees
Sandy Bay Football Club coaches
Australian Army personnel of World War II